Łęczna  is a village in the administrative district of Gmina Płoty, within Gryfice County, West Pomeranian Voivodeship, in north-western Poland. It is located within the historic region of Pomerania.

From 1871 to 1945 the area was part of Germany. From 1975 to 1998 Łęczna was located within the Szczecin Voivodeship.

References

Villages in Gryfice County